Xiaoqi Feng is a Chinese plant geneticist, currently based at the John Innes Centre, Norwich, England.

From 2008 to 2010, Feng was a Lecturer at the University of Oxford where she won the Mendel Medal in the Biological and Biomedical Sciences category of the SET (science, engineering and technology) for Britain award, before moving to work as a Postdoctoral Researcher under Daniel Zilbermann at the University of California, Berkeley in 2011. She remained at Berkeley until 2014, when she joined the John Innes Centre as a Project Leader.

In 2018, Feng was named one of 26 Young Investigators named by the European Molecular Biology Organization (EMBO).

Feng is currently researching epigenetic reprogramming in plant germlines and is credited with the discovery of 'immortal plant cells', which provide a reprogramming mechanism that allows plants to maintain fitness down the generations.

References 

Year of birth missing (living people)
Living people
Chinese geneticists
Chinese women biologists
Academics of the University of Oxford
University of California, Berkeley staff
Chinese expatriates in England
21st-century Chinese botanists
Chinese expatriates in the United States